The Episcopal Conference of Nicaragua is the episcopate of Nicaragua. The CEN is a member of the Latin American Episcopal Conference and the Central Episcopal Secretariate of America (CESA).

Bishops
List of presidents of the Bishops' Conference:

 1963-1968: Vicente Alejandro González y Robleto, archbishop of Managua
 1968-1969: Isidro Augusto Oviedo y Reyes, bishop of León en Nicaragua
 1969-1971: Donaldo Núñez Chavez, auxiliary bishop of Managua
 1971-1975: Miguel Obando y Bravo, archbishop of Managua
 1975-1979: Manuel Salazar y Espinoza, Bishop of León en Nicaragua
 1979-1983: Miguel Obando y Bravo, archbishop of Managua
 1983-1985: Pablo Antonio Vega Mantilla, Bishop of Juigalpa
 1985-1989: Miguel Obando y Bravo, archbishop of Managua
 1989-1991: Albert Salvador Schlaefer Berg, Vicar Apostolic of Bluefields
 1991-1993: César Bosco Vivas Robelo, bishop of León en Nicaragua
 1993-1997: Miguel Obando y Bravo, archbishop of Managua
 1997-1999: César Bosco Vivas Robelo, bishop of León en Nicaragua
 1999-2005: Miguel Obando y Bravo, archbishop of Managua
 2005: César Bosco Vivas Robelo, bishop of León en Nicaragua
 2005-2011: Leopoldo José Brenes Solórzano, archbishop of Managua
 2011 - ... Rene Sócrates Sándigo Jirón, bishop of Juigalpa

See also
 Catholic Church in Nicaragua

References

External links
 http://www.cen-nicaragua.org/

Nicaragua
Catholic Church in Nicaragua

it:Chiesa cattolica in Nicaragua#Conferenza_episcopale